2 Cygni is a blue-white hued star in the northern constellation of Cygnus, located a few degrees from Albireo. It is a probable astrometric binary; the visible component can be viewed with the naked eye, having an apparent visual magnitude of 4.976.

The stellar classification of the primary is B3 IV, matching a B-type subgiant star. It has seven times the mass of the Sun and about 5.6 times the Sun's radius. The star is 37 million years old with a high rate of spin; it has a projected rotational velocity of 137 km/s. It is radiating 3,354 times the Sun's luminosity from its photosphere at an effective temperature of 16,479 K.

References

B-type subgiants
Runaway stars
Cygnus (constellation)
Durchmusterung objects
Cygni, 02
182568
095372
7372